The 2007–08  Wichita Thunder season was the 16th season of the CHL franchise in Wichita, Kansas.

Regular season

Conference standings

See also
2007–08 CHL season

External links
2007–08 Wichita Thunder season at Hockey Database

Wichita Thunder seasons
Wich